Midnight Diner is a Japanese anthology TV series directed by Joji Matsuoka, based on the manga of the same name by Yarō Abe. The show was produced by MBS for its initial three season run from 2009 to 2014 before being acquired by Netflix Japan in 2016. Netflix would go on to produce and distribute the fourth and fifth seasons of the show (released outside Japan as Midnight Diner: Tokyo Stories) with the fourth season premiering on October 21, 2016 and the fifth season on October 31, 2019.

Summary
When people finish their day and hurry home, my day starts. My diner is open from midnight to seven in the morning. They call it "Midnight Diner". That's all I have on my menu. But I make whatever customers request as long as I have the ingredients for it. That's my policy. Do I even have customers? More than you would expect. 

Midnight Diner takes place inside a small izakaya with only "Meshiya" (the equivalent of an American diner's "EATS") as signage in Shinjuku, Tokyo. The restaurant's opening hours are from 12:00 am to 7:00 am, and is a popular destination for the diverse nightlife of Shinjuku. Each episode begins with the character known only as "Master" preparing his signature tonjiru and narrating his nightly routine. Master always offers to produce any dish that a customer may want, providing he has the ingredients on hand and is not something overly complicated. He refers to this as his "dining policy". 

The diner is frequented by a varied group of customers, ranging from salarymen, to Yakuza, and prostitutes. Each episode deals with a story focused on a particular customer as well as a particular Japanese dish, often the favorite meal of the character that the episode is about. Each episode ends with Master giving a brief demonstration of how to prepare the dish while a character from the episode gives verbal instructions directly to the audience. While the characters are largely transitional, and are mainly seen in their own self-contained episodes, some are often seen in the background as minor characters or cameos in one or two other episodes. Several characters are regular customers of the diner and reappear regularly.

Episodes
The following is a list of episodes for the series Midnight Diner, which began airing in Japan on October 9, 2009. The series has also released two feature films in Japanese theaters: Midnight Diner (2014) on January 31, 2015 and Midnight Diner 2 (2016) on November 5, 2016.

Season 1

Season 2

Season 3

Season 4
(Released as "Midnight Diner: Tokyo Stories (Season 1)").

Season 5
(Released as "Midnight Diner: Tokyo Stories (Season 2)").

References

External links 
 https://www.imdb.com/title/tt3958276/

Midnight Diner